FC ZLiN Gomel was a Belarusian football club based in Gomel.

History
The club was founded in 1989. From 1989 till 1991 they played in Belarusian SSR league, and from 1992 until 2005 in Belarusian First and Second leagues.

Before the start of 2006 season the club merged with Slavia Mozyr to form FC Mozyr-ZLiN, which became a successor of Slavia and was eventually renamed back to Slavia Mozyr.

The club name ZLiN stands for Zavod Litya i Normaley (Foundry and Standards Works, a plant based in Gomel).

Performance history
{|class="wikitable"
|-bgcolor="#efefef"
! Season
! League
! Pos.
! Pl.
! W
! D
! L
! GS
! GA
! P
!Cup
!Notes
!Manager
|-
|align=right|1992
|align=right bgcolor=#98bb98|3D
|align=right bgcolor=#cc9966|3
|align=right|15||align=right|9||align=right|2||align=right|4
|align=right|22||align=right|15||align=right|20
|align=right|Last 32
|align=right|
|
|-
|align=right|1992-93
|align=right bgcolor=#ffa07a|2D
|align=right|6
|align=right|30||align=right|14||align=right|6||align=right|10
|align=right|51||align=right|37||align=right|34
|align=right|
|align=right|
|
|-
|align=right|1993-94
|align=right bgcolor=#ffa07a|2D
|align=right|7
|align=right|28||align=right|9||align=right|8||align=right|11
|align=right|28||align=right|37||align=right|26
|align=right|
|align=right|
|
|-
|align=right|1994-95
|align=right bgcolor=#ffa07a|2D
|align=right|14
|align=right|30||align=right|8||align=right|5||align=right|17
|align=right|26||align=right|67||align=right|21
|align=right|Last 64
|align=right|Relegated
|
|-
|align=right|1995
|align=right bgcolor=#98bb98|3D - B
|align=right|11
|align=right|12||align=right|3||align=right|2||align=right|7
|align=right|16||align=right|19||align=right|11
|rowspan=2 align=right|
|align=right|
|
|-
|align=right|1996
|align=right bgcolor=#98bb98|3D - B
|align=right|12
|align=right|26||align=right|6||align=right|6||align=right|14
|align=right|35||align=right|43||align=right|24
|align=right|
|
|-
|align=right|1997
|align=right bgcolor=#98bb98|3D - B
|align=right bgcolor=#cc9966|3
|align=right|28||align=right|17||align=right|5||align=right|6
|align=right|60||align=right|27||align=right|56
|
|align=right|Promoted
|
|-
|align=right|1998
|align=right bgcolor=#ffa07a|2D
|align=right|7
|align=right|30||align=right|12||align=right|8||align=right|10
|align=right|42||align=right|41||align=right|44
|align=right|
|align=right|
|
|-
|align=right|1999
|align=right bgcolor=#ffa07a|2D
|align=right|11
|align=right|30||align=right|9||align=right|9||align=right|12
|align=right|37||align=right|30||align=right|36
|align=right|
|align=right|
|
|-
|align=right|2000
|align=right bgcolor=#ffa07a|2D
|align=right|12
|align=right|30||align=right|10||align=right|8||align=right|12
|align=right|30||align=right|25||align=right|38
|align=right|2nd round
|align=right|
|
|-
|align=right|2001
|align=right bgcolor=#ffa07a|2D
|align=right|7
|align=right|28||align=right|9||align=right|8||align=right|11
|align=right|35||align=right|36||align=right|35
|align=right|1st round
|align=right|
|
|-
|align=right|2002
|align=right bgcolor=#ffa07a|2D
|align=right|7
|align=right|30||align=right|14||align=right|4||align=right|12
|align=right|42||align=right|34||align=right|46
|align=right|
|align=right|
|
|-
|align=right|2003
|align=right bgcolor=#ffa07a|2D
|align=right|6
|align=right|30||align=right|14||align=right|6||align=right|10
|align=right|47||align=right|38||align=right|48
|align=right|
|align=right|
|
|-
|align=right|2004
|align=right bgcolor=#ffa07a|2D
|align=right|5
|align=right|30||align=right|12||align=right|10||align=right|8
|align=right|31||align=right|18||align=right|46
|align=right|
|align=right|
|
|-
|align=right|2005
|align=right bgcolor=#ffa07a|2D
|align=right|4
|align=right|30||align=right|14||align=right|12||align=right|4
|align=right|35||align=right|17||align=right|54
|align=right|2nd round
|align=right|Merged
|
|-
|align=right|2006
|align=right bgcolor=#ffa07a|2D
|align=right|
|align=right|—||align=right|—||align=right|—||align=right|—
|align=right|—||align=right|—||align=right|
|align=right|1st round
|align=right|
|
|-
|}

References

External links
 Club profile at footballfacts.ru

Defunct football clubs in Belarus
Sport in Gomel
Association football clubs established in 1989
Association football clubs disestablished in 2006